Tonosí District is a district (distrito) of Los Santos Province in Panama. The population according to the 2000 census was 9,736. The district covers a total area of 1,294 km². The capital lies at the city of Tonosí.

Administrative divisions
Tonosí District is divided administratively into the following corregimientos:

Tonosí (capital)
Altos de Guera
Cañas
El Bebedero
El Cacao
El Cortezo
Flores
Guánico
La Tronosa
Cambutal
Isla de Cañas

References

Districts of Panama
Los Santos Province